Eze Vincent Okeuhie (born 6 June 1993) is a Nigerian footballer, who plays as a winger.

Career
Born in Lagos, and often referred to simply as Vincent Eze, he arrived to Turkish side Çaykur Rizespor in the start of the season 2012–13, however, they loaned him for the second half of the season to Kartal S.K. Playing with Kartal S.K. in the TFF First League, he made 9 appearances for the club.

Afterwards, he played with Cypriot clubs Apollon Limassol, Nea Salamina and Omonia. In 2016 he joined Tunisian CA Bizertin, but quickly left the team without making an appearance, before moving to Serbia and joining FK Metalac Gornji Milanovac. On 16 January 2018, Okeuhie signed a three-year-deal with Vojvodina. On 28 January 2020, Okeuhie signed a two-year-deal with Čukarički. On 17 January 2021, Okeuhie joined Belarusian Premier League champions Shakhtyor Soligorsk.

References

1993 births
Living people
Nigerian footballers
Association football forwards
Nigerian expatriate footballers
Nigerian expatriate sportspeople in Cyprus
Expatriate footballers in Turkey
Expatriate footballers in Cyprus
Expatriate footballers in Tunisia
Expatriate footballers in Serbia
Expatriate footballers in Belarus
Cypriot First Division players
Serbian First League players
Serbian SuperLiga players
Çaykur Rizespor footballers
Kartalspor footballers
Apollon Limassol FC players
Nea Salamis Famagusta FC players
AC Omonia players
CA Bizertin players
FK Metalac Gornji Milanovac players
FK Vojvodina players
FK Čukarički players
FC Shakhtyor Soligorsk players